Manisha Eerabathini is an Indian-American playback singer and actress who works in the Telugu film industry.

Career 
Her 2017 song "Arere Yekkada" was a major hit and brought recognition to her name and talent.

In 2018, she sang with Roll Rida in the song "Arupu," released as a music video. The song's message and depiction is about the abuse against women. It received critical acclaim.
Manisha debuted as an actress with the film Fidaa directed by Sekhar Kammula, and then appeared in the film Veera Simha Reddy.

References

External links 
 
 Manisha Eerabathini - YouTube

Telugu playback singers
21st-century Indian women singers
21st-century Indian singers
Living people
Year of birth missing (living people)
Singers from Andhra Pradesh